New Delhi Lok Sabha constituency is one of the 7 Lok Sabha (parliamentary) constituencies in the Indian National Capital Territory of Delhi. This constituency came into existence in 1951. It is the oldest constituency of Delhi that currently exists.

Assembly segments
Following the delimitation of the parliamentary constituencies, since 2008, it comprises the following Delhi Vidhan Sabha segments:

From 1993–2008, it comprised the following Delhi Vidhan Sabha segments:
 Sarojini Nagar (Polling stations 1-93)
 Gole Market (Polling stations 1-100)
 Minto Road (Polling stations 1-135)
 Kasturba Nagar (Polling stations 1-21 and 23-114)
 Jangpura
 Matia Mahal (Polling stations 84-108)
From 1966–93, New Delhi Lok Sabha constituency comprised the following Delhi Metropolitan Council segments:
 Sarojini Nagar
 Laxmibai Nagar
 Gole Market
 Bara Khamba
 Minto Road
 Jangpura
 Kasturba Nagar
 Lajpat Nagar

Members of Parliament
The New Delhi Lok Sabha constituency was created in 1967. The list of Member of Parliament (MP) is as follows:

Election results

17th Lok Sabha: 2019 General Elections

16th Lok Sabha: 2014 General Elections

15th Lok Sabha: 2009 General Elections

14th Lok Sabha: 2004 General Elections

13th Lok Sabha: 1999 General Elections

12th Lok Sabha: 1998 General Elections

11th Lok Sabha: 1996 General Elections

10th Lok Sabha: 1991 General Elections

10th Lok Sabha: 1992 By Election
 The bye-poll was held because Advani retained Gandhinagar seat which he had won in 1991, and vacated New Delhi seat.

9th Lok Sabha: 1989 General Elections

8th Lok Sabha: 1984 General Elections

7th Lok Sabha: 1980 General Elections

6th Lok Sabha: 1977 General Elections

5th Lok Sabha: 1971 General Elections

4th Lok Sabha: 1967 General Elections

3rd Lok Sabha: 1962 General Elections

2nd Lok Sabha: 1957 General Elections
 Sucheta Kripalani (Congress) 
 Sucheta Kripalani resigned her Lok Sabha seat in 1960 and became a minister in Uttar Pradesh.

2nd Lok Sabha: 1961 By Election

1st Lok Sabha: 1952 Election

See also
 List of Constituencies of the Lok Sabha

References

Lok Sabha constituencies in Delhi
1951 establishments in India
Constituencies established in 1951